Austrotrachyceras is a genus of ammonite cephalopod, belonging to the order Ceratitida.

The family to which Austrotrachyceras belongs, Trachyceratidae involute, highly ornamented shells and ceratitic to ammonitic sutures.

References

Bibliography

Trachyceratidae
Triassic ammonites
Fossils of British Columbia
Carnian genera
Ceratitida genera